In That Land... is a 1997 Russian drama film directed by Lidia Bobrova.

Plot 
The film takes place in a Russian village, in whose life there is everything: birth and death, the struggle of love and hatred, good and evil, honor and betrayal...

Cast 
 Dmitri Klopov
 Vladimir Borchaninov	
 Anna Ovsyannikova
 Aleksandr Stakheyev
 Andrei Dunayev
 Tatyana Zakharova		
 Zoya Buryak		
 Svetlana Gaytan

References

External links 
 

1997 films
1990s Russian-language films
Russian drama films
1997 drama films